Holton is a former settlement in Los Angeles County, California. It lay at an elevation of 49 feet (15 m). Holton still appeared on USGS maps as of 1924.  It was located on the Pacific Ocean south-southeast of Playa del Rey and west of the Los Angeles International Airport.  It had a stop on the Redondo Beach via Playa del Rey Line of the Pacific Electric Railway.  The settlement has been given over to dunes restoration and flight approaches.

References

Former settlements in Los Angeles County, California
Former populated places in California